The Municipality of Radovljica is a municipality in the Upper Carniola region of northern Slovenia. The administrative seat of the municipality is the town of Radovljica.

Geography
It is located at the southern slope of the Karawanks mountain range at the confluence of the Sava Dolinka and the Sava Bohinjka, both headwaters of the Sava River.

Settlements
In addition to the municipal seat of Radovljica, the municipality also includes the following settlements:

 Begunje na Gorenjskem
 Brda
 Brezje
 Brezovica
 Češnjica pri Kropi
 Črnivec
 Dobravica
 Dobro Polje
 Dvorska Vas
 Globoko
 Gorica
 Hlebce
 Hraše
 Kamna Gorica
 Kropa
 Lancovo
 Lesce
 Lipnica
 Ljubno
 Mišače
 Mlaka
 Mošnje
 Noše
 Nova Vas pri Lescah
 Otoče
 Ovsiše
 Peračica
 Podnart
 Poljče
 Poljšica pri Podnartu
 Posavec
 Praproše
 Prezrenje
 Ravnica
 Rovte
 Slatna
 Spodnja Dobrava
 Spodnja Lipnica
 Spodnji Otok
 Srednja Dobrava
 Srednja Vas
 Studenčice
 Vošče
 Vrbnje
 Zadnja Vas
 Zaloše
 Zapuže
 Zgornja Dobrava
 Zgornja Lipnica
 Zgornji Otok
 Zgoša

References

External links

 Municipality of Radovljica on Geopedia
 Municipality of Radovljica website 

 
Radovljica
1994 establishments in Slovenia